Miss Syria is a national beauty pageant in Syria.

History
In 1952, Leila Teresa Tuma, aged 18, won the first version of Miss Syria, but she did not participate in any International competition due to private reasons which prevented her from travelling abroad. In 1965, Raymonde Doucco was the first Miss World contestant to represent Syria.

Syria at International pageants

Miss World Syria

Miss Earth Syria

References

Syria
Recurring events established in 1965